Emanuel Howe may refer to:
 Emanuel Scrope Howe (c. 1663–1709), English diplomat, army officer and Member of Parliament
 Emanuel Howe, 2nd Viscount Howe (1700–1735), British politician and Governor of Barbados